Alina Chirica (born 9 April 2004) is a Moldovan footballer who plays as a forward for Women's Championship club Agarista-ȘS Anenii Noi and the Moldova women's national team.

References

2004 births
Living people
Moldovan women's footballers
Women's association football forwards
Moldova women's international footballers
Agarista-ȘS Anenii Noi players